Marcus Marshall (born 25 November 1978) is a former Champ Car driver from Australia.

Biography
He began racing in British Formula Three, where he was generally a running outside the top ten, but took a hard-fought win in a wet race. He contested 12 races in 2005 for Derrick Walker's renamed Team Australia Racing.  A lack of experience blighted his year and he scored only two top-ten finishes, the best of which was 8th in Edmonton.  He was fired and replaced by Will Power prior to the season finale in Mexico City after what was described as a "serious breach of contract".

On 12 February 2006 Marshall raced for A1 Team Australia in round 8 of the A1 Grand Prix series at the Sentul International Circuit in Indonesia and finished third in the feature race, behind Canadian Sean McIntosh and Malaysian Alex Yoong. He practiced in Mexico, but did not race. During 2006, Marshall is racing full-time in the touring car [[V8 Supercar series for Paul Cruickshank Racing but lost his drive for 2007. He returned to Carrera Cup, taking over Peter Fitzgerald's car in the series after Fitzgerald retired at the end of the 2006 season. Marshall has also returned to V8Supercar, taking occasional drives with Matthew White Racing in the second tier series, before taking over Jack Perkins Commodore in the Perkins Engineering team after Perkins was forced to step aside with a medical condition. 2008 saw a move back to Ford and Britek Motorsport.

After a frustrating 2009 season Marshall has had a new team established around him, Marcus Marshall Motorsport, to be known by the sponsored identity as IntaRacing named for primary sponsor Intabill.

Racing record

Career results

† Team result

Complete Champ Car results
(key)

Complete A1 Grand Prix results
(key) (Races in bold indicate pole position) (Races in italics indicate fastest lap)

Complete Bathurst 1000 results

References 

 Conrod V8 Prifile
 Speedsport Profile
 Driver Database Profile
 Racing Reference Profile

1978 births
A1 Team Australia drivers
Australian Formula 3 Championship drivers
British Formula Three Championship drivers
Champ Car drivers
Formula Ford drivers
Living people
People from Burnie, Tasmania
Racing drivers from Tasmania
Supercars Championship drivers
Porsche Supercup drivers
Australian Endurance Championship drivers
A1 Grand Prix drivers
Garry Rogers Motorsport drivers
Fortec Motorsport drivers
Walker Racing drivers
Dick Johnson Racing drivers
Alan Docking Racing drivers